Todd Michael Richards (born October 20, 1966) is an American ice hockey coach and former player. He is the current assistant coach of the Nashville Predators of the National Hockey League (NHL).

Playing career
Richards was drafted by the Montreal Canadiens in the second round (33rd overall) of the 1985 NHL Entry Draft. He played for the University of Minnesota for four seasons.

He began his professional career with the Sherbrooke Canadiens during the 1989–90 AHL season. After being traded early the next season to the Hartford Whalers organization, he helped the Springfield Indians win the 1991 Calder Cup. Richards also made his NHL debut during that season, playing two games and recording four assists for the Whalers. Richards spent two more seasons with the Indians before beginning to play in the IHL, spending two seasons with the Las Vegas Thunder, and six seasons with the Orlando Solar Bears. He ended his playing career in 2002 with the Genève-Servette HC of the National League A in Switzerland.

Coaching career
After retiring from playing, Richards spent four seasons as an assistant coach for the Milwaukee Admirals. The Admirals advanced to the playoffs each year. In 2004, Milwaukee won the Calder Cup, after sweeping the Wilkes-Barre/Scranton Penguins in four games.

On August 3, 2006, Richards became the fifth head coach of the Wilkes-Barre/Scranton Penguins. During his first season, he guided Wilkes-Barre/Scranton to a 51-24-2-4 record and a second-place finish in the AHL’s East Division. The Penguins advanced to the East Division Finals before falling to the Hershey Bears.

Richards signed as an assistant coach with the San Jose Sharks of the NHL for the 2008–09 season.

Richards became the second head coach in the history of the Minnesota Wild in June 2009, and the first native of Minnesota to hold the job. After two seasons as head coach and posting a record of 77-71-16, Richards was fired on April 11, 2011. In both seasons, the Wild were in playoff contention most of the season but ended up missing the playoffs.  

In June 2011, Richards had been hired by the Columbus Blue Jackets as an assistant coach under head coach Scott Arniel. After a poor first half of the season, Arniel was fired on January 9, 2012, and Richards was named as interim head coach.

On May 14, 2012, the Columbus Blue Jackets signed Richards to a two-year contract, making him the sixth full-time coach in team history. On April 19, 2014, Richards led the Blue Jackets to their first ever Stanley Cup playoff victory, a 4-3 double overtime win over the Pittsburgh Penguins. On April 23, Richards coached the Blue Jackets to their first ever Stanley Cup playoff home victory, winning 4-3 in overtime over the Pittsburgh Penguins. On May 27, the Blue Jackets signed Richards to a two-year contract extension through the 2016-17 season. On October 21, 2015, after starting the season 0–7, the Blue Jackets relieved Richards of his duties as head coach.

On June 7, 2016, the Tampa Bay Lightning hired Richards as an assistant coach. On September 28, 2020, he won the Stanley Cup with the Lightning.

On October 23, 2020, the Nashville Predators hired Richards as an assistant coach under head coach John Hynes.

Personal life
Richards is the father of Justin Richards who is under contract with the New York Rangers. Richards' brother, Travis Richards, is a former ice hockey player.

Career statistics

Regular season and playoffs

NHL coaching record

Awards and honors

References

External links

1966 births
Living people
American ice hockey coaches
American men's ice hockey defensemen
Columbus Blue Jackets coaches
Fredericton Canadiens players
Genève-Servette HC players
Hartford Whalers players
Ice hockey coaches from Minnesota
Las Vegas Thunder players
Minnesota Golden Gophers men's ice hockey players
Minnesota Wild coaches
Montreal Canadiens draft picks
Orlando Solar Bears (IHL) players
People from Crystal, Minnesota
San Jose Sharks coaches
Sherbrooke Canadiens players
Springfield Indians players
Stanley Cup champions
Tampa Bay Lightning coaches
Wilkes-Barre/Scranton Penguins head coaches
AHCA Division I men's ice hockey All-Americans
Ice hockey players from Minnesota